Nanyangqiao Township is an rural township in Zhuzhou County, Zhuzhou City, Hunan Province, People's Republic of China.

Cityscape
The township is divided into 17 villages, the following areas: Zaohechong Village, Zhuyuanchong Village, Nanyanchong Village, Chengxialong Village, Zhoujiabu Village, Hengjiang Village, Tiexi Village, Nan'an Village, Zhuji Village, Chengtang Village, Sanwangchong Village, Dabaqiao Village, Majiawan Village, Jianzuowan Village, Tongshan Village, Nanyangqiao Village, and Yuanjiazhou Village.

References

Historic township-level divisions of Zhuzhou County